Davis Rich Dewey (April 7, 1858December 13, 1942) was an American economist and statistician.

He was born at Burlington, Vermont. Like his well-known younger brother, John Dewey, he was educated at the University of Vermont and Johns Hopkins University. He later became professor of economics and statistics at the Massachusetts Institute of Technology. He was chairman of the Massachusetts state board on the question of the unemployed (1895), member of the Massachusetts commission on public, charitable, and reformatory interests (1897), special expert agent on wages for the 12th census, and member of a state commission (1904) on industrial relations.

Dewey became managing editor of the American Economic Review in 1911. He wrote and published:
 Syllabus on Political History since 1815 (1887)
 
 Employees and Wages: Special Report on the Twelfth Census (1903)
 National Problems (1907)

The primary library for the MIT Sloan School of Management, MIT Department of Economics, and MIT Department of Political Science is named after Dewey.

References

External links 

 Davis Rich Dewey Papers, MC-0070. Massachusetts Institute of Technology, Department of Distinctive Collections, Cambridge, Massachusetts.

1858 births
1942 deaths
American statisticians
American economics writers
American male non-fiction writers
Writers from Burlington, Vermont
University of Vermont alumni
Johns Hopkins University alumni
Presidents of the American Economic Association
Economics journal editors
Economists from Vermont
American Economic Review editors